Mayor of Harlem is an honorific title that may refer to:

Willie Bryant (1908–1964), emcee of the Apollo Theater
Tommy Smalls (1926–1972), radio disc jockey in New York City
Leslie Wyche (1944–2018), New York City community activist
Greg Bandy (1949–), Harlem grand drummer
Alpo Martinez (1966–), Harlem drug dealer
Queen Mother Dr. Delois Blakely, an American nun and activist who was named Queen Mother of Harlem by Mayor Rudy Giuliani

See also
De Mayor of Harlem, a 1985 book of poetry by American David Henderson